Aaron Manby was a landmark vessel in the science of shipbuilding as the first iron steamship to go to sea. She was built by Aaron Manby (1776–1850) at the Horseley Ironworks. She made the voyage to Paris in June 1822 under Captain (later Admiral) Charles Napier, with Aaron's son Charles on board as engineer. Aaron Manby was then used by the Compagnie des bateaux a vapeur en fer to operate its service between Paris and Le Havre.

Vessel history 
Launched in 1821, Aaron Manby was the first steamship to be built of iron. She was the brainchild of the eccentric but far-seeing naval officer Captain (later Admiral) Charles Napier, who had conceived the idea of a fleet of steamships for service on the River Seine. The ship was named after the master of the Horseley Ironworks, Tipton, Staffordshire, where she was pre-fabricated to a design jointly formulated by Captain Napier, Aaron Manby and his son Charles. She was then shipped in pieces to Rotherhithe on the Thames and assembled there. Her flat-bottomed hull was made of  iron plate fastened to angle-iron ribs. There was one deck, of wood, and a bowsprit. The ship's distinctive profile boasted a single  funnel. The engine was of the oscillating type, designed and patented (British Patent No 4558 of 1821) by Aaron Manby. Defying the prevailing wisdom of the day, the iron-hulled vessel not only floated but made  and drew  less water than any other steamboat then operating.

The ship proceeded up the Seine to Paris, where she caused a great stir and where she was based for the next decade. This has been claimed (incorrectly) as the first passage from Britain to France by steam ship. There had been shorter crossings by wooden steamers, but Napier's was the first direct steam crossing from London to Paris and the first seagoing voyage by an iron ship anywhere. After some further channel voyages the ship was used for pleasure trips up and down the Seine. On the failure of Napier's enterprise through bankruptcy in 1827 (after he had financed the building of five similar iron steamships) she was sold to a French consortium ("Compagnie des bateaux a vapeur en fer") who operated her on the River Loire until she was broken up in 1855. The use of iron plates for the hull, in place of wood, was widely copied in shipbuilding during the following decades. Napier had conceived the ship as a first step towards an iron warship, and in this sense Aaron Manby could be considered a direct ancestor of the Royal Navy's first iron frigate, built the year of Napier's death.

See also
 Vulcan, first iron vessel, a horse-drawn barge, maiden voyage May 1819.
 Charlotte Dundas, first commercial steam propelled vessel, maiden voyage 1802.

Notes

References
 Peter Kemp (ed), The Oxford Companion to Ships and the Sea (Oxford University Press, 1976, corr. edition 1979) 
 Bernard Dumpleton, The Story of the Paddle Steamer (Antony Rowe Ltd, Eastbourne, 1973, 2002)
 Aaron Manby, Builder of the First Iron Steamship, Newcomen Transactions, Vol.29, 1953–5, page 77.

History of Staffordshire
Steamships of the United Kingdom
1821 ships